Sergei Borisovich Smorgachyov (born 30 March 1968 in Moscow) is a former Russian football player.

He played one game for the main squad of FC Spartak Moscow in the USSR Federation Cup.

References

1968 births
Footballers from Moscow
Living people
Soviet footballers
FC Dynamo Moscow reserves players
FC Spartak Moscow players
FC Shinnik Yaroslavl players
Russian footballers
Russian Premier League players
Association football defenders